The 2023 UCI Cycling World Championships will be the inaugural edition of the UCI Cycling World Championships organised by the  (UCI), and is scheduled to be held between 3 and 13 August 2023 in Glasgow, and across Scotland. 

The UCI Cycling World Championships, to be held every four years in the year preceding the Olympic Games, brings together various disciplines of cycling for them to be held as part of one event, including the UCI Road World Championships, UCI Mountain Bike World Championships and UCI Track Cycling World Championships. 

The UCI Cyclo-cross World Championships, which are considered a winter discipline, and the UCI Gravel World Championships which were introduced after the awarding of the 2023 championships, and require a specific terrain, will not be included.

The event has a budget of £45–50 million, with funding coming from various local and national bodies, including the Scottish Government and UK Sport. Glasgow City Council provided £15 million to the championships after it was predicted the economic boost would total £67 million.

Championships and locations
The 2023 UCI Cycling World Championships will host 13 individual UCI World Championships, and be the biggest ever cycling event. It has been confirmed that the following events will feature, with the full schedule announced on 8 September 2022.

In total, over 190 world champions will be crowned and 2,600 athletes are set to travel to compete at the events with a further 8,000 cyclists taking part in a mass participation event.

Notes

References

External links 
 

UCI Road World Championships by year
UCI Track Cycling World Championships by year
World Championships
World Championships
World Championships
World Championships
UCI
UCI
International cycle races hosted by Scotland
International sports competitions in Glasgow
2020s in Glasgow
UCI
Cycling